I Wasn't Born to Lose You is the fifth studio album by British alternative rock band Swervedriver. It was released on 3 March 2015 through the Cobraside record label. It is the band's first album in 17 years, since 1998's 99th Dream.

The first single off the album, "Setting Sun", was released on 13 January 2015.

Background
After the conclusion of their "Raise" mini-tour, Swervedriver began recording material for a new album at Birdland Studios in Melbourne and then continued work at Konk Studios over the first half of 2014. On 19 September 2014, the band stated via Twitter that they were mixing the album, which had a tentative release date of early 2015. On 7 January 2015, the band revealed the title, the track listing and the cover art of the album.

The first single off the album, "Setting Sun", features a cover of the Television song "Days" as a B-side. The album also features the song "Deep Wound", which was released as a single in September 2013.

Promotional videos were also released for "Autodidact", "English Subtitles" and "Lone Star".

Critical reception

Writing for Exclaim!, Daniel Sylvester wrote that the band are "as loose and confident as they've ever sounded," further calling the album "a solid return from a band eager to sound like themselves again."

Track listing

 "Autodidact" - 5:00
 "Last Rites" - 3:26
 "For a Day Like Tomorrow" - 5:29
 "Setting Sun" - 2:52
 "Everso" - 6:44
 "English Subtitles" - 5:20
 "Red Queen Arms Race" - 5:40
 "Deep Wound" - 3:59
 "Lone Star" - 4:33
 "I Wonder?" - 5:39

Personnel
Swervedriver
 Adam Franklin – vocals, guitar
 Jimmy Hartridge – guitar 
 Steve George – bass, vocals
 Mikey Jones – drums, percussion

References

2015 albums
Swervedriver albums